Ruggero Pasquarelli (born 10 September 1993), known professionally as by the stage name Ruggero (stylised in all caps), is an Italian singer and actor. In 2010, he took part in the fourth series of the Italian talent show X Factor. He is also known for his performance as Federico in the Argentine telenovela Violetta (2012–2015) and as Matteo Balsano in Soy Luna (2016–2018).

Biography

Early life
Ruggero Pasquarelli was born in his house, Abruzzo, on 10 September 1993, to Bruno and Antonella Pasquarelli, and he grew up in Città Sant'Angelo, a town in the province of Pescara.
As a child, he took guitar and acting lessons. In 2008, Pasquarelli started taking singing lessons, and since 2009 he also studied piano. He has a brother named Leonardo Pasquarelli. In high school, Pasquarelli studied at the pedagogical liceo, and specialized in Arts and Entertainment. While he was a high school student, he also became a singer of the local rock band 65013.

X Factor
In 2010, during his senior year of high school, Pasquarelli auditioned for the fourth series of the Italian talent show X Factor. As a result, he was chosen by Mara Maionchi as a member of the "Boys" category. During the seventh live show, Pasquarelli finished in the bottom two for the first time, together with Cassandra Raffaele, but only Raffaele's judge, Elio, voted to eliminate Pasquarelli, and he was therefore saved. He finished once again in the bottom two during the tenth live show. Pasquarelli was not allowed to perform during the final showdown, since he was 17 years old, and Italian laws don't allow performances of people under the age of majority after midnight. A pre-recorded performance was broadcast instead. The judges vote resulted in a deadlock, and the public vote saved Nevruz, and Pasquarelli finished the competition in sixth place.

Violetta
In 2012, Pasquarelli landed the role of Federico in the Argentine telenovela Violetta.

The first episode he appeared in was  “An Approach, A Song” (season one, episode 56) until the series finale (season three, episode 80). He also took part in the European tour with all the cast.

Soy Luna
In 2015, Pasquarelli was cast as the male protagonist Matteo Balsano in the Latin American Disney Channel telenovela Soy Luna. From 2016 until 2018 he displayed his role in all three seasons, consisting of 220 episodes. 
He also took part in the three Live Tours in 2017 and 2018, playing shows in Latin America and Europe.
In 2017, he released his first self-written song called 'Allá voy' on the Soy Luna Soundtrack. In 2018, he released his second self-written song "Esta noche no paro" on the Soy Luna Soundtrack as well.

Solo singing career 
On June 20, 2019, he released his first single "Probablemente", followed by the second single, "No Te Voy a Fallar", released on September 10, 2019. In addition, he announced the Nuestro Tour, a small tour that took place between October and December of the same year around South America. Also in 2019 he collaborated with MYA, a duo of South American singers, on the single "Apenas Son Las 12".

In March 2020, he signed with Sony Music Argentina.

On July 8, 2020, he released his fourth single titled "Puede", and on September 9 of the same year, his fifth single titled "Bella" was released. On October 9, 2020, he collaborated with Tres Dedos on a new song titled "Por Eso Estoy Aquì". In the final months of 2020, he released two more singles: "Dos Extraños" on November 19, 2020, and "Mil Razones" on December 17, 2020.

On April 24, 2021, he announced that his self-titled debut album, Ruggero, would be released on April 29, 2021. On the month of the album's release, he released two other singles: "Úsame" with Dvicio on April 1 and "Si Tú No Estás" three days prior to the album's release. "Probablemente", "No Te Voy A Fallar" and "Apenas Son Las 12" were not included in the album.

The cover of "Senza una Donna" was released as single on October 21, 2021. On June 7, 2022, he released his second studio album, Volver a Cero, preceded by the singles, "Se Vive Solo Una Vida", "Ya Fue" and "Nos Dejamos Enseguida" with Fabro.

Personal life
Since 2012, he resides and works in Buenos Aires, Argentina.

Filmography

Discography

Studio albums

Singles

Promotional singles

Other appearances

Awards and nominations

References

External links

1993 births
Living people
People from Pescara
Italian male television actors
X Factor (Italian TV series) contestants
21st-century Italian singers